Binibining Pilipinas 1991 was the 28th edition of Binibining Pilipinas. It took place at the Araneta Coliseum in Quezon City, Metro Manila, Philippines on March 3, 1991.

At the end of the event, Germelina Padilla crowned Anjanette Abayari as Binibining Pilipinas Universe 1991, Jennifer Pingree crowned Maria Patricia Betita as Binibining Pilipinas International 1991, and Precious Tongko crowned Maria Lourdes Gonzalez as Binibining Pilipinas Maja 1991. Selina Manalad was named First Runner-Up, while Jenette Fernando was named Second Runner-Up.

Later that year, Anjanette Abayari relinquished her title due to citizenship issues and was replaced by Maria Lourdes Gonzales as Binibining Pilipinas Universe 1991. Selina Manalad assumed the title of Binibining Pilipinas Maja 1991, Jenette Fernando assumed the First Runner-Up position while Anna Marie Torres, one of the 12 semi-finalists, assumed the Second Runner-Up position.

Results 
 
 Color keys

  The contestant was a Semi-Finalist in an International pageant.
  The contestant did not place.

Special Awards

Contestants 
34 contestants competed for the three titles.

References 

Binibining Pilipinas
1991 beauty pageants